Boeing Black is a secure Android smartphone built by Boeing and BlackBerry Limited, targeted for (United States) government and military defense communities, and people "that need to keep communications and data secure". On February 27, 2014, Boeing filed with the U.S. Federal Communications Commission.

Features
According to Boeing Defense, Space & Security Division, The Black has embedded hardware security features, can be configured through software policies, and has endless modularity capabilities. The phone can self-destruct if it is tampered with, and will feature two slots for SIM cards.

References

See also 
 Boeing Black Smartphone

Android (operating system) devices
Mobile phones
Boeing
BlackBerry Limited smartphones
Mobile phones introduced in 2014